Lisburn Distillery Football Club is a Northern Irish intermediate football club who are based in Ballyskeagh, County Down. A founder member of the Irish League, they currently play in the NIFL Premier Intermediate League, the third tier of the Northern Ireland Football League. The club was simply known as Distillery Football Club from 1880 to 1999.

History 
The club, founded in 1880, originated in west Belfast, where it was based at Grosvenor Park at Distillery Street off the Grosvenor Road until 1971. After sharing Skegoneill Avenue (Brantwood) and Seaview (Crusaders) for some years, the club moved in 1980 to a permanent new home at New Grosvenor Stadium, Ballyskeagh, County Antrim, on the southern outskirts of Belfast.

The club was known simply as Distillery from its foundation until 1999, when it changed its official name to 'Lisburn Distillery' to associate itself more closely with its adopted borough (now city) of Lisburn. However, the club is still colloquially referred to as "Distillery". The club colour is white. A founder member of the Irish League in 1890, the club was relegated from the Premiership in May 2013.

European record

Overview

Matches

Current squad

Managerial history 

  Neil Harris (1932–34)
  Michael Hamill (24 July 1934 to 31 March 1935)
  Bob Preston (19 April 1935 to 6 January 1937)
  Joe McCleery (4 March 1937 to 14 August 1937) 
  William McDevitt (25 January 1938 to 20 Mar 1939)
  Alf Peachey (3 May 1940 to 29 March 1945)
  Gordon Clark (18 February 1949 to 12 January 1950)
  Eddie Lonsdale (16 January 1950 to 11 August 1950)
  Robert Gunning (12 August 1950 to 7 September 1951)
  Jimmy McIntosh (20 June 1952 to 17 February 1955)
  Maurice Tadman (30 June 1955 to 16 December 1958)
  George Eastham Sr. (16 June 1959 to 12 March 1964)
  Tommy Casey (25 January 1967 to 12 October 1968)
  Jimmy McAlinden (5 February 1969 to 12 May 1975)
  Roy Welsh (29 September 1975 to 31 October 1977)
  Gibby MacKenzie (31 October 1977 to 19 December 1979)
  Bertie Neill (20 December 1979 to 5 February 1981)
  Tommy Lowrie (13 February 1981 to 6 September 1981)
  Jimmy Brown (18 Sep 1981 to 7 December 1981)
  Marty Quinn (September/October 1988 to 18 November 1989)
  Billy Hamilton (16 December 1989 to 16 February 1996) 
  Paul Kirk (17 February 1996 to 14 May 2009) 
  Jimmy Brown 19 May 2009 to 18 September 2009
  Tommy Wright (26 September 2009 to 2 November 2011)
  John Cunningham (6 November 2011 to 7 May 2012)
  Tim McCann (24 May 2012 to 16 April 2013)
  Tommy Kincaid (2 May 2013 to 12 Oct 2015)
  Sean-Paul Murray (3 November 2015 to 24 May 2016)
  Colin McIlwaine/Colin McIlwaine & George O'Boyle (24 May 2016 to 5 April 2019))
  Stephen Hatfield (23 April 2019 to 8 March 2020)
  Johnny Clapham (17 March 2020 to 22 April 2022)
  Raymond Alexander (12 May 2022 to 15 June 2022)
  Barry Johnston (21 June 2022 –

Honours

Senior honours 
 Irish League (tier 1): 6 (inc. one shared)
 1895–96, 1898–99, 1900–01, 1902–03, 1905–06 (shared), 1962–63
 Irish League First Division (tier 2): 2
 1998–99, 2001–02
Irish Cup: 12
 1883–84, 1884–85, 1885–86, 1888–89, 1893–94, 1895–96, 1902–03, 1904–05, 1909–10, 1924–25, 1955–56, 1970–71
 Irish League Cup: 1
 2010–11
 County Antrim Shield: 14
 1888–89, 1892–93, 1895–96, 1896–97, 1899–1900, 1902–03, 1904–05, 1914–15, 1918–19, 1919–20, 1945–46, 1953–54, 1963–64, 1985–86
 Gold Cup: 5
 1913–14, 1919–20, 1924–25, 1929–30, 1993–94
 City Cup: 5
 1904–05, 1912–13, 1933–34, 1959–60, 1962–63
 Ulster Cup: 2
 1957–58, 1998–99
 Belfast Charity Cup: 5
 1899–1900, 1915–16, 1920–21, 1928–29, 1930–31 
 Dublin and Belfast Inter-city Cup: 1
 1947–48 (shared)

Intermediate honours 
 Irish Intermediate Cup: 3
 1892–93†, 1902–03†, 1947–48‡
 Steel & Sons Cup: 1
 1900–01ƒ
 George Wilson Cup: 3
 1956–57‡, 1981–82‡, 1987–88‡
 McElroy Cup: 2
 1918–19‡, 1920–21‡

† Won by Distillery Rovers (reserve team)

‡ Won by Distillery II (reserve team)

ƒ Won by Distillery West End (reserve team)

Junior honours 
 Irish Junior League: 3
 1890–91‡, 1892–93‡, 1902–03‡
 Irish Junior Cup: 1
 1887–88‡

‡ Won by Distillery II (reserve team)

References

External links 
 

 
Association football clubs established in 1880
Association football clubs in Northern Ireland
Association football clubs in County Down
1880 establishments in Ireland
Sport in Lisburn
Former senior Irish Football League clubs
Founding members of the Irish Football Association
NIFL Premier Intermediate League clubs
Association football clubs in Belfast
Works association football teams in Northern Ireland